Igbinedion University, Okada (IUO) is a privately owned university in Nigeria (West Africa). It was founded and established on 10 May 1999, following the Certificate of approval by the Federal Government of Nigeria with the Certificate No. 001. Thus, Igbinedion University became the first licensed Private University in Nigeria, and the foundation students arrived at Okada on Friday, 15 October 1999. The University is located at Okada, headquarters of Ovia North-East Local Government Area, Edo State.

The university was founded by Sir Gabriel Osawaru Igbinedion CFR, a philanthropist, and a Chief in Benin City. 
Its graduate and undergraduate programs are accredited by the National Universities Commission (NUC) and the relevant professional bodies.

Colleges 
The university is made up of seven Colleges namely:

 Oba Erediauwa College of Law
 Alayeluwa Oba Okunade Sijuwade College of Health Sciences
 Oba Adeyeye Enitan Ogunwusi Ojaja II College of Natural and Applied Sciences
 Sanusi Lamido Sanusi College of Business and Management Studies
 Prof. Dora Akunyili College of Pharmacy
 General Abdulsalami A. Abubakar College of Engineering
 Goodluck Ebele Jonathan College of Arts and Social Sciences.

It also has an enrolment of over 5000 students across the seven colleges.

The University was headed by Late Professor Anthony Uyekpen Osagie, who was appointed the first Substantive Vice-Chancellor who served from 29 October 1999 to 30 November 2003, and Professor Nduka Uraih served as the Deputy Vice Chancellor from 2000 till 2003 and as Acting Vice Chancellor from December, 2003 to 11 September 2004.  On 13 September 2004 Rev. Professor Eghosa Osaghae assumed duty as the second substantive Vice Chancellor till June 2018, when Prof. Lawrence Ezemwonye took over.  Hence, Prof. Ezemwonye became the third vice-chancellor in the university's existence.

The University has recorded several landmark achievements, including being the first Private University to produce medical doctors in Sub-Saharan Africa.

The institution is devoted to developing and strengthening the academic programs offered in the various colleges to meet international standards and preparing them for accreditation by the National Universities Commission (NUC), the federal agency that has responsibility for quality assurance and maintenance of standards, and the relevant national regulatory professional bodies. The latter bodies include the Medical and Dental Council of Nigeria, MDCN (Medicine), Council of Legal Education (Law), Council for the Regulation of Engineering in Nigeria, COREN (Engineering), Computer Professional Council of Nigeria (Computer Science), and Institute of Chartered Accountants of Nigeria, ICAN (Accounting). The accreditation of all the programs, including medicine, law, engineering, and accounting by these bodies confirms the high quality of academic programs offered by the university. Also, more than 60%  of its first degree graduands yearly proceed for postgraduate studies abroad with a high success rate and commendation, according to its Vice-Chancellor during the institution's convocation ceremony in November 2013.

Quite early in its life, and in line with its vision of being an internationally competitive university, IUO identified external linkages and networking with (older and mentoring-capable) universities and development partners as strategic to realizing its goals. By March 2007, the university had established linkages with the University of Westminster (UK) in the areas of staff development, diplomatic studies and ICT and Howard University, USA (telemedicine and teleconferencing), and was finalizing an exchange programe with East Carolina University (USA) in the area of global development. The university was admitted into full membership of the Global University Network for Innovation (GUNI) based in Barcelona, Spain, the European Association for International Education, EAIE, and the Network Towards Unity for Health (Maastricht, the Netherlands), amongst other external affiliations. It was also part of the Consortium of Development Partnerships, CDP, a conglomerate of universities, research institutions, governments and development partners in North America, Europe and West Africa. IUO’s Centre for Presidential Studies coordinated and continues to coordinate Module 8 of the CDP’s project on Local Contexts of Conflict and Peace-building in West Africa, which involves researchers from Ghana, Mali, Côte d'Ivoire, Senegal, the Netherlands and Nigeria.

Academic Programs

Faculty and departments
College Of Health Sciences
Medicine and Surgery
Medical Laboratory Science
Anatomy
Physiology
Nursing Science
College of Pharmacy
Pharmacology and Toxicology
Pharmaceutical Chemistry
Clinical Pharmacy and Pharmacy Practice
Pharmaceutics and Pharmaceutical Technology
Pharmaceutical Microbiology
Pharmacognosy
College Of Engineering
Chemical/Petroleum Engineering. 
Civil Engineering. 
Electrical/Electronics and Computer.
Mechanical Engineering. 
College of Arts and Social Sciences 
Economics and Development Studies
Geography, Urban and Regional Planning
Mass Communication
Political Science and Public Administration
Sociology and Anthropology
International Relations and Strategic Studies
Theatre Arts
English
College Of Natural and Applied Sciences
Computer Science and Information Technology
Biochemistry
Microbiology
Industrial Chemistry.
Physics.
College Of Business and Management Studies
Accounting
Banking and Finance
Business Administration
College Of Law 
Law

Reputation

The University has produced over 10,000 graduates in various undergraduate and post-graduate courses. Since its inception in 1999 working at reputable firms within and outside Nigeria. It has also secured funding from various individuals and bodies like the Central Bank of Nigeria, which funded the construction of an ultra-modern library for the school and Air Marshall Paul Dike, former Chief of Air Staff who donated a complex.

Notable alumni

 Agboola Ajayi
 Regina Daniels
 Ibrahim Hassan Dankwambo, Governor Gombe State. 
 Kingsley Kuku, Former National Adviser, Niger Delta Affairs.
 Professor Damilola Sunday Olawuyi, Senior Advocate of Nigeria and Vice Chair of the International Law Association
 Anita Ukah
 Sisi Yemmie, Youtuber blogger.

References

External links
 

 
1999 establishments in Nigeria
Education in Benin City
Educational institutions established in 1999